Lampronia sublustris is a moth of the family Prodoxidae first described by Annette Frances Braun in 1925. In North America it is found from southern British Columbia south to northern California and east to Alberta, Utah and Colorado.

The wingspan is 12–16 mm. The forewings are unicolorous pale straw yellow. The hindwings are uniformly gray. Adults are on wing in June.

The larvae probably feed on Rosa woodsii.

References

Moths described in 1925
Prodoxidae
Moths of North America